Sławomir Cienciała (born 19 March 1983 in Cieszyn) is a Polish former football player.

References

External links
 

1983 births
Living people
Polish footballers
Podbeskidzie Bielsko-Biała players
FC Etar 1924 Veliko Tarnovo players
Expatriate footballers in Bulgaria
First Professional Football League (Bulgaria) players
People from Cieszyn
Sportspeople from Silesian Voivodeship
Association football defenders
Odra Opole players
Arka Gdynia players
Flota Świnoujście players